The Flying Cow Ranch is a tourist attraction ranch in Nanhe Village, Tongxiao Township, Miaoli County, Taiwan.

History
The ranch was originally established as Central Youth Dairy Farm in 1975. In 1995, it was renamed to Flying Cow Ranch.

Architecture
The ranch spans over an area of 50 hectares and the pasture and cow raising area of 120 hectares. It is located at an altitude of 180-270 meters. The ranch features accommodation services, food and beverages services, dairy products sales and barbecue and camping sites.

Transportation
The ranch is accessible South East from Tongxiao Station of the Taiwan Railways.

See also
 List of tourist attractions in Taiwan

References

External links

 

1975 establishments in Taiwan
Buildings and structures completed in 1975
Ranches in Taiwan
Tourist attractions in Miaoli County